Sardar Saeed Ul Haq Dogar (Punjabi)  (born 4 December 1946- died 10 November 2005) was a Pakistani politician who served as Member of Provincial Assembly from 1997 to 1999 in a Constituency PP-140 Sheikhupura.

In 1997, he was elected for Member of Provincial Assembly by a wide margin. He defeated incumbent Rai Ejaz Ahmad Khan who was MPA from this constituency and Minister of Forests from 1993 to 1996 and brother of Rai Saeed Ahmad Khan who was Advisor to the Chief Minister.

Personal life 
He was born in Safdarabad, West-Pakistan on December 4, 1946, a year before the nation's founding. He came from a religious family. He attended Govt. High School at Safdarabad. He then enrolled in Civil Lines College, Lahore. He obtained his BA degree from Government College, Sheikhupura and studied law privately.

His murdered brother was ex-MPA Safdar ul Haq Dogar and his uncle was ex-MPA Sardar Abdul Rasheed Dogar. He died on November 10, 2005 in Lahore.

Saeed ul Haq Dogar died in November 2006.

Career

He worked in Lahore secretariat (Law Department) until 1990.

When Safdar was murdered, Saeed ul Haq was working in the Punjab Government Secretariat. Safdar's murder led Saeed to enter politics to serve poor people. He was elected as n the 1997 Elections as an independent candidate and later joined Pakistan Muslim League (N).

See also
 Provincial Assembly of Punjab
 Dogar
 Pakistan
 Safdarabad
 MPA
 Sheikhupura

References

1946 births
2005 deaths
Pakistan Muslim League (N) politicians
People from Sheikhupura District
Punjabi people